Ben Warland (born 4 September 1996) is an Australian professional footballer who plays as a central defender for Adelaide United.

Club career 
He made his professional debut in the A-League against Melbourne City on 25 April 2015.

On 31 January 2018, it was announced that Warland would leave Adelaide United on a -year deal with Sydney FC. Warland made his debut for the club on 13 March 2018. Coming off the bench against Kashima Antlers in the 2018 AFC Champions League.

On 4 February 2021, Warland signed a two year extension with Sydney FC

On 24 June 2022, Warland departed Sydney FC after four seasons with the club. Following his departure he returned to Adelaide United, signing a two-year contract.

Honours

Club
Sydney FC
A-League Premiership: 2017–18, 2019–20
A-League Championship: 2019, 2020

External links

References

1996 births
Living people
Association football defenders
Australian soccer players
Adelaide United FC players
Sydney FC players
National Premier Leagues players
People from Gawler, South Australia